The 1906 Tour de France was the fourth edition of the Tour de France, and the second to use the points system. Taking place from 4 to 29 July, the total race distance was  run over 13 stages, with the winner averaging . New to this year's edition were the mountain climbs in the Massif Central. However, like its predecessors, cheating and sabotage still took place. Four competitors were disqualified for taking trains as a shortcut and spectators threw nails on the road. However, this did not stop René Pottier from taking a big lead in the first stages. Free of the tendinitis that had plagued his 1905 chances, he dominated the entire race.

Innovations and changes
Tour organiser Henri Desgrange had been happy with the increased length of the 1905 Tour de France, and decided to put even more stages in the 1906 version.

The introduction of mountain stages had also been successful, so this year not only the Vosges were included, but also the Massif Central.

The increased length made it possible to follow the borders of France, and in 1906 the perimeter was closely followed.

 The points system in the 1905 Tour de France had been successful enough in reducing cheating, so the Tour organisers used it again in the 1906 Tour de France, with a few changes: whereas in 1905, time differences still had some effect on the points distribution, in 1906 time differences were unimportant, and points were only given for the order in which the cyclists finished. The winner of the stage received one point, the second rider two points, et cetera. After the eighth stage, only 16 cyclists were remaining, and the results from the first eight stages were recalculated, with only the remaining cyclists, and the points were redistributed among the remaining riders in accordance with their positions in those stages.

The first stage ended in Lille and the second stage started in Douai; this was the first time that a stage did not start where the previous stage ended.
Also for the first time, the Tour went outside France: in the second stage, Germany (Alsace-Lorraine was then part of Germany) was visited, then several days later Italy (Ventimiglia) and Spain (Irun) too.

The 1906 Tour also saw the introduction of the flamme rouge (red flame), a red flag that indicates that the cyclists only have one kilometre to go.

Participants

There were 100 cyclists signed up for the race, but only 76 of them came to the start. One of the absentees was Henri Cornet, winner of the 1904 Tour de France. Four cyclists were Belgian, one was Luxembourgian (later winner François Faber), two were German, and the rest were French. Louis Trousselier, winner of the 1905 Tour de France, was present. The riders were not grouped in teams, but some cyclists had the same sponsor, even though they were not allowed to work together. Before the race started, most was expected from Cadolle, Aucouturier, Georget, Pottier, Trousselier, Dortignac and Petit-Breton.

As in 1905, the cyclists were divided in two categories, the coureurs de vitesse and the coureurs sur machines poinçonnées, where the riders in the first category were allowed to change bicycles, which could be an advantage in the mountains, where they could use a bicycle with lower gears. In 1905, sponsors had not been so enthusiastic about entering their cyclists in this category, but in 1906 they had learned that it had a commercial advantage to have cyclists starting in the poinçonnées category, because the average French citizen could identify more with them. In 1906, more than half of the cyclists started in the poinçonnées category, including Lucien Petit-Breton, one of the pre-favourites.

Race overview

As in previous years, the spectators tried to assist their preferred riders by trying to impede their opponents. On the first stage, nails had been thrown on the road, and all cyclists except Lucien Petit-Breton punctured. This stage was won by Emile Georget in a sprint.

In the second stage, René Pottier, who had shown his climbing abilities in the previous edition, aimed for the victory. He was stopped after  with mechanical failure, and he lost 58 minutes.

In the third stage, four cyclists (Julien Gabory, Henri Gauban, Gaston Tuvache and Maurice Carrere) were disqualified for taking the train. The Ballon d'Alsace, which had been the first real mountain in the Tour de France the previous year, was featured again. Just as the year before, it was mounted first by Pottier. The stage was also won by Pottier, more than 45 minutes ahead of the rest.

Pottier also won the fourth stage. In the fifth stage, he was leading by one hour at the halfway point. A cycling legend says that he decided to stop, entered a bar and ordered a bottle of wine, and drank it almost completely. When he saw the first other cyclists passing by, Pottier mounted his bicycle again, went after them, and won the stage. By this point, Pottier was leading the overall classification firmly. The winner of the 1905 Tour de France, Louis Trousselier, had had a bad first half of the Tour, and was many points behind. Trousselier rediscovered his form in the second half of the race, won the 7th, 9th, 10th and 11th stages, and was challenging the second place of Georges Passerieu. Passerieu defended his position by winning the 12th stage. In the last stage, Pottier showed his strength by winning the stage, after finishing together in Paris with Passerieu.

Results

Stage results

After the 13th stage, the race was followed by two timed exhibition laps on the Velodrome in Paris, the result of which was not counted for the overall classification.

General classification

One hundred cyclists had entered for the 1906 Tour de France; only 82 of them showed up at the start. Only 49 cyclists finished the first stage, and the number of active cyclists quickly fell to 37 in stage two, 29 in stage three, until 16 after stage eight. At that point, the points given in the first eight stages were redistributed among the remaining riders in accordance with their positions in those stages. At the end of the Tour de France, only 14 cyclists finished. The cyclists were not grouped in teams; some cyclists had the same sponsor, but they were not allowed to work together.

Other classifications
Lucien Petit-Breton was the winner of the "machines poinçonnées" category.

The organising newspaper l'Auto named René Pottier the meilleur grimpeur. This unofficial title is the precursor to the mountains classification.

Aftermath
The Tour organisers did not make many changes the rules or route for the next race, because they had worked in the 1906 Tour de France. The revised points system would be kept in this form until 1911, only to be changed a little bit in 1912 before being replaced by the time system in 1913. The flamme rouge that was introduced in 1906 to indicate the final kilometre of a stage was kept and is still in use.

René Pottier would not defend his title in the 1907 Tour de France, because he would commit suicide before, after discovering that his wife had had an affair while he was riding the Tour. Petit-Breton and Georget would start again in the 1907 Tour and duel for the overall victory, which would be won by Petit-Breton.

To honor Pottier's achievements on the Ballon d'Alsace, a monument was placed for him on top of that mountain.

Notes

References

Bibliography

External links

 
Tour de France
Tour de France by year
Tour de France
Tour de France